Odontria is a genus of beetle of the family Scarabaeidae.

Taxonomy
Odontria contains the following species:
 Odontria decepta
 Odontria carinata
 Odontria aureopilosa
 Odontria australis
 Odontria cassiniae
 Odontria albonotata
 Odontria nesobia
 Odontria variegata
 Odontria cinnamomea
 Odontria smithii
 Odontria inconspicua
 Odontria halli
 Odontria varicolorata
 Odontria autumnalis
 Odontria rufescens
 Odontria macrothoracica
 Odontria communis
 Odontria convexa
 Odontria giveni
 Odontria marmorata
 Odontria monticola
 Odontria nitidula
 Odontria obscura
 Odontria obsoleta
 Odontria occiputale
 Odontria velutina
 Odontria fusca
 Odontria magnum
 Odontria sandageri
 Odontria borealis
 Odontria subnitida
 Odontria sylvatica
 Odontria aurantia
 Odontria suavis
 Odontria regalis
 Odontria xanthosticta
 Odontria magna
 Odontria striata

References

Odontria